Xinzhuang station may refer to:

 Xinzhuang railway station (Shanghai), a railway station in Shanghai, China
 Xinzhuang station (Shanghai Metro), a metro station in Shanghai, China
 Xinzhuang MRT station, a metro station in New Taipei, Taiwan
 Xinzhuang railway station (Taiwan), a railway station in Hsinchu, Taiwan

See also
 Xinzhuang (disambiguation)